Pseudomedon is a genus of beetles belonging to the family Staphylinidae.

The species of this genus are found in Europe and Northern America.

Species:
 Pseudomedon afghanicus Assing, 2008 
 Pseudomedon alabamae Casey, 1905

References

Staphylinidae
Staphylinidae genera